William Byrne (14 August 1896 – 19 July 1930) was an Australian rules footballer who played for the Fitzroy Football Club in the Victorian Football League (VFL).

His brother Charlie Byrne also played with him at Fitzroy.

Notes

External links 

1896 births
Fitzroy Football Club players
Australian rules footballers from Victoria (Australia)
1930 deaths